The Deutscher Krimi Preis, or the German Crime Fiction Award, is the oldest and most prestigious German literary prize for crime fiction.

It has been awarded since 1985 by the Bochum Crime Archive. Unlike the Friedrich Glauser Prize, which is awarded by the authors' group The Syndicate, the judges are literary scholars, critics and booksellers. By their own definition, they appreciate the literary skill and original content that give the genre a new impetus. The best new releases of German crime fiction are awarded prizes numbered 1 through 3. In a second category, there are also three awards for newly translated works by international authors.

From its inception, it was decided to not hold a public award ceremony for the winners. However, in 2003, the award was presented publicly as part of the Munich Crime Festival for the first time. In 2004, a public ceremony was held on the occasion of the festival Murder on the Hellweg in Unna. In the subsequent years there was a return to the initial procedure of not holding a public ceremony; instead, the winners were made known only via an announcement.

Winners
The most successful writers in the national category are the Swiss author Peter Zeindler, who won the Award four times between 1986 and 1992 (each time receiving the first place award), and the German author Friedrich Ani, who won five times between 2002 and 2013 (the 1st place once, and the 2nd place four times). In the international category, the late American writer Ross Thomas won the prize (each time in 1st place) four times between 1986 and 1996.

In the table below, the names of the original or translated English titles are given in brackets.

References

External links
 
 

German literary awards
German-language literary awards
Fiction awards
Awards established in 1985
Mystery and detective fiction awards
1985 establishments in Germany